José Javier Viñes Rueda (17 February 1937 – 25 January 2023) was a Spanish doctor and politician. A member of the Navarrese People's Union, he served in the Parliament of Navarre from 1999 to 2003 and in the Senate from 1989 to 1993.

Viñes died in Pamplona on 25 January 2023 at the age of 85.

References

1937 births
2023 deaths
Members of the Senate of Spain
People from Soria
University of Navarra alumni
Navarrese People's Union politicians
Public University of Navarre alumni